The 1976 Cleveland Browns season was the franchise's 31st as a professional sports franchise and their 27th season as a member of the National Football League. The Browns were coached by second-year coach Forrest Gregg, and ended their season with a record of 9–5, being third in their division. The team's top draft choice was running back Mike Pruitt. Brian Sipe firmly took control at quarterback. Sipe had been inserted into the lineup after a Mike Phipps injury in the season-opening win against the New York Jets on September 12. After a 1–3 start brought visions of another disastrous year, the Browns jolted the two-time defending Super Bowl champion Pittsburgh Steelers with an 18–16 victory on October 10. Third-string quarterback Dave Mays helped lead the team to that victory, while defensive end Joe "Turkey" Jones' pile-driving sack of quarterback Terry Bradshaw fueled the heated rivalry between the two teams. That win was the first of eight in the next nine weeks, helping put the Browns in contention for the AFC playoffs. A loss to the Kansas City Chiefs in the regular-season finale cost them a share of the division title, but running back Greg Pruitt continued his outstanding play by rushing for exactly 1,000 yards, his second-straight four-digit season.

Offseason

NFL Draft 
The following were selected in the 1976 NFL Draft.

Exhibition schedule

Regular season schedule

Standings

Staff / Coaches

Roster

Game summaries

Week 5 vs Steelers 

Turkey Jones knocked out Terry Bradshaw in this contest.

Week 6: at Atlanta

Notes and references

External links 
 1976 Cleveland Browns at Pro Football Reference
 1976 Cleveland Browns Statistics at jt-sw.com
 1976 Cleveland Browns Schedule at jt-sw.com
 1976 Cleveland Browns at DatabaseFootball.com  

Cleveland
Cleveland Browns seasons
Cleveland Browns